Leander James 'Lee' Talbott (July 12, 1887 – September 16, 1954) was an American track and field athlete, tug of war competitor, and wrestler from Kansas City, Missouri. He attended the Mercersburg Academy and was a weight thrower first at Cornell University in 1907 and then at Penn State in 1909. He was a member of the Kansas City Athletic Club, and he competed in the 1908 Summer Olympics as a member of the Irish American Athletic Club. In his prime, Talbott stood 6' 6" inches and weighed 220 lbs.

In 1908 he finished fifth in the hammer throw competition, sixth in the discus throw event, and eighth in the shot put competition.

Talbott was a member of the American tug of war team that refused to compete against the Liverpool Police team after the first round of the controversial Olympic tug of war event. He also participated as a wrestler in the freestyle heavyweight event but was eliminated in the first round after losing his bout to the upcoming gold medalist, Con O'Kelly.  He is the only athlete to compete in three sports at one Olympic Games celebration.

In 1909 he won the hammer throw in the Amateur Athletic Union championship, and in 1909 and 1915 he was the champion in the 56-lb. weight throw. Between 1909 and 1917 Talbott won 20 medals at the Amateur Athletic Union championships in the shot put, discus throw, hammer throw, and the 56-lb. weight throw.

See also
List of Pennsylvania State University Olympians

Notes

1887 births
1954 deaths
American male hammer throwers
American male shot putters
American male discus throwers
Olympic track and field athletes of the United States
Olympic tug of war competitors of the United States
Olympic wrestlers of the United States
Athletes (track and field) at the 1908 Summer Olympics
Tug of war competitors at the 1908 Summer Olympics
Wrestlers at the 1908 Summer Olympics
Male weight throwers
American male sport wrestlers
Sportspeople from Kansas City, Missouri
Track and field athletes from Kansas City, Missouri